Kiana Takairangi (born 20 July 1992) is a New Zealand professional rugby league footballer who currently plays for the Newcastle Knights in the NRL Women's Premiership.

She previously played for the Sydney Roosters in the NRLW and the Cronulla-Sutherland Sharks in the NSWRL Women's Premiership.

Background
Kiana is the sister of Cook Islands and New Zealand international Brad Takairangi. Her father, Louis, played three games for the Parramatta Eels in 1987.

She has also played for the Los Angeles Temptation in the Legends Football League.

Playing career
In 2017, Takairangi represented the Cook Islands at the 2017 Women's Rugby League World Cup.

On 1 July 2019, she was named in the Sydney Roosters NRL Women's Premiership squad.

In Round 1 of the 2019 NRL Women's season, she made her debut for the Roosters in a 12–16 loss to the New Zealand Warriors. In October 2019, she was a member of New Zealand's 2019 Rugby League World Cup 9s-winning squad.

In 2020, Takairangi re-signed with the Roosters as a development player for the 2020 NRL Women's season.

In June 2022, Takairangi signed with the Newcastle Knights for the 2022 season. She made her club debut for the Knights in round 1 of the 2022 NRLW season against the Brisbane Broncos.

On 2 October 2022, Takairangi played in the Knights' NRLW Grand Final win over the Parramatta Eels, scoring two tries in the Knights' 32-12 victory.

References

External links
Newcastle Knights profile
Sydney Roosters profile
Kiwi Ferns profile

1992 births
Living people
Australian people of Cook Island descent
Australian people of Māori descent
Australian female rugby league players
Cook Islands women's national rugby league team players
New Zealand women's national rugby league team players
Rugby league wingers
Rugby league centres
Sydney Roosters (NRLW) players
Newcastle Knights (NRLW) players
Legends Football League players